Sir Nobonk and the Terrible Dreadful Awful Naughty Nasty Dragon (also known by the shorter title of Sir Nobonk and the... Dragon) is a 1982 comedy novel written by Spike Milligan, and the fourth picture book by Milligan after The Bald Twit Lion, Badjelly the Witch and Dip the Puppy.

Overview
The story of Sir Nobonk is a generic parody of traditional stories about knights and dragons, set within a medieval world with modern anachronisms for comic purposes (such as garden hoses for knights to wash out their armour).

Plot
The story takes place in the mythical Kingdom of Rotten Custard, a kingdom that exists within Cornwall, where knights are constantly at war with the Dragons. Among the knights is a 60-year-old knight named Sir Nobonk, who becomes a dragon-catcher in order to save the dragons from extinction.

Setting forth into the nearby forest, Sir Nobonk successfully captures the last living dragon, and convinces the king to open a zoo to help dragons to repopulate. The plan becomes successful, and also helps humans and dragons to co-exist peacefully within the kingdom.

However, the prosperity of the kingdom invokes a giant named Blackmangle to attack the kingdom along with his servant Witch-Way, leaving it to Sir Nobonk to face the new foes and to save the kingdom.

Characters
Sir Nobonk - A 60-year-old knight-turned-dragon catcher
Big Bill - Sir Nobonk's strong but dimwitted groom
Little Willy - Nobonk's youngest (and most intelligent) groom
The Wizard of Nothing - An incredibly small dwarf Nobonk encounters whilst hunting for dragons
Blackmangle - An evil giant who rules over the neighbouring Kingdom of Dangle, who wishes to claim the tame dragons for himself
Witch Way - Blackmangle's servant, an evil witch
Daz - Nobonk's white stallion, who eats grass and chips
King Big-Twytt - Ruler of the Kingdom of Rotten Custard

References

Sources
Milligan, S. (1982) Sir Nobonk and the Terrible Dreadful Awful Naughty Nasty Dragon London: Book Club Associates

1982 British novels
Children's fantasy novels
British comedy novels
Novels by Spike Milligan
Michael Joseph books